Sharp Humor (April 21, 2003 – March 31, 2015) was a Thoroughbred race horse.

Connections
Sharp Humor is co-owned by the Purdedel Stable, trained by Dale Romans, and ridden by Mark Guidry. Sharp Humor was bred in New York by Patrica S. Purdy. Just before the running of the Kentucky Derby of 2006, WinStar Farm in Versailles, Kentucky, (where his sire, Distorted Humor stands), acquired a share in him.

Breeding
Sharp Humor is the son of Distorted Humor out of the mare Bellona.  His sire is a son of Forty Niner who is in turn a son of the very influential Mr. Prospector.

Races

Sharp Humor fractured his knee in the Kentucky Derby and underwent surgery on May 11, 2006 at the Rood & Riddle Equine Hospital in Lexington.  After recovering, he underwent therapeutic swimming at the Kesmark Equine Rehabilitation Center also in Lexington.  Sharp Humor was exported to South Korea in 2011 and stood at stud at the Let's Run Stud Farm on Jeju Island. He sustained a paddock accident in March and his death was reported to the media on March 31, 2015.

References

 Sharp Humor's pedigree
 NTRA bio

2003 racehorse births
2015 racehorse deaths
Racehorses bred in New York (state)
Racehorses trained in the United States
Thoroughbred family 1-n